Hungary competed at the 2014 Winter Olympics in Sochi, Russia, from 7 to 23 February 2014. A team of 16 athletes competing in five sports were selected to the team.

Before the Games began, the Hungarian Olympic Committee received a threatening letter which warned of an attack on its athletes at the Games. It was dismissed as not being credible.

Alpine skiing 

According to the quota allocation released on 20 January 2014, Hungary had three athletes in qualification position. Edit Miklós's 7th-place finish in the women's downhill set a new record as the highest placing alpine skiing at the Winter Olympics for the country. As for Anna Berecz, she was remarked for being one of the few, along Tina Maze and Macarena Simari Birkner, to complete all the five races in which she competed.

Biathlon 

Hungary received two reallocation quota spots in biathlon.

Cross-country skiing 

According to the final quota allocation released on 20 January 2014, Hungary qualified two athletes.

Distance

Sprint

Short track speed skating 

Hungary qualified 5 women and 3 men for the Olympics during World Cup 3 and 4 in November 2013.

Men

Women

Qualification legend: ADV – Advanced due to being impeded by another skater; FA – Qualify to medal round; FB – Qualify to consolation round

Speed skating 

Based on the results from the fall World Cups during the 2013–14 ISU Speed Skating World Cup season, Hungary earned the following start quota:

Men

References

External links 

 
 

Nations at the 2014 Winter Olympics
2014
2014 in Hungarian sport